Charlotte Moore (born 4 January 1985) is a runner who completed for England in the 800 metres at the 2002 Commonwealth Games in Manchester.

Career
Moore attended Bournemouth School for Girls, and was a member of Bournemouth Athletics Club. In 2001, she competed in the European Youth Summer Olympics, where she sustained an ankle injury in the final. Later in the year, she competed at a Great Britain against USA junior international event.

Aged 17, Moore competed for England in the 800 metres event at the 2002 Commonwealth Games, after coming third in the trials for the event. In the semi-finals, she set an English under-20 record time of 2:00.95, which allowed her to qualify for the final. The time was five seconds quicker than her season's best performance. In the final, Moore became the first English junior to run the 800 metres in under 2 minutes. She finished sixth in the race, in a time of 1:59.75. She competed in the 800 metres event at the 2003 World Championships in Athletics. After two years away from sport with an injury, Moore won the 2008 Swanage half-marathon.

References

External links
 

1985 births
Living people
British female athletes
Athletes (track and field) at the 2002 Commonwealth Games
Sportspeople from Bournemouth
Commonwealth Games competitors for England